Oscar Poigny, real name Daniel-Oscar Peigne, born 5 April 1849 in Bordeaux was a 19th-century French dancer and choreographer. His date of death is unknown.

We know very little about Oscar Poigny save that he was a dancer in Paris in 1876 and that he arrived in Brussels in September 1877, hired by Joseph Hansen, ballet master at the Théâtre de la Monnaie. When Hansen left in 1879, Poigny became in turn ballet master and remained in this position until 1886. From 1886 to 1889, he served in the same post in Lyon.

Choreographies 
1880: Une nuit de Noël, music by Oscar Stoumon (Brussels, 13 October)
1881: Hérodiade, music by Jules Massenet (Brussels, 19 December)
1882: Les Sorrentines, music by Oscar Stoumon (Brussels, 26 October)
1884: Le Poète et l'Étoile music by Jacques Steveniers (Brussels, 21 April)
1885: La Tzigane, music by Oscar Stoumon (Brussels, 27 March)
1890: Bouquetière, music by Émile Pichoz (Lyon, 3 February)
1890: Massilia, music by Armand Tedesco (Marseille, 25 March)
1893: Une fête au camp (Marseille, 28 January)
1893: Réïa, music by Joseph Monsigu (Marseille, 20 April)
1895: Les Madrilènes , music by François Perpignan (Royan, 8 August)
1895: L'Abeille et les Fleurs , music by Louis Ganne (Royan, 10 August)
1895: Les Mésaventures de Zéphirin, music by François Perpignan (Royan, 7 September)  
1896: Rose d'amour, music by Pascal Clemente (Marseille, 1 January)

Bibliography 
 Jacques Isnardon, Le théatre de la Monnaie depuis sa fondation jusqu'à nos jours. Schott Frères. Brussel. 1890.

French male dancers
French choreographers
French ballet masters
Entertainers from Bordeaux
1849 births
Year of death missing